The Jamaica national football team, nicknamed the "Reggae Boyz", represents Jamaica in international football. The team's first match was against Haiti in 1925. The squad is under the supervising body of the Jamaica Football Federation (JFF), which is a member of the Caribbean Football Union (CFU), Confederation of North, Central American and Caribbean Association Football (CONCACAF), and the global jurisdiction of FIFA. Jamaica's home matches have been played at Independence Park since its opening in 1962.

Their sole appearance in the FIFA World Cup was in 1998, where the team finished third in its group and failed to advance. The team also competed in the Caribbean Cup winning six times. Jamaica also competes in the CONCACAF Gold Cup, appearing thirteen times and finishing twice as runners-up to Mexico in 2015 and the United States in 2017. They were also invited to the Copa América in 2015 and 2016, being eliminated in the group stage on both occasions.

History

Early history (1893–1962) 

In 1893, Jamaica's first football club, the Kingston Cricket Club, was formed. In 1910, the Jamaica Football Federation (JFF) was formed and controlled all of the games; in 1925, Jamaica was invited to play Haiti in a three match series with the team winning all three games 1–0, 2–1, and 3–0. In 1926, Jamaica hosted Haiti at Sabina Park and won 6–0. At the 1930 Central American Games in Cuba, Jamaica made its first international tournament appearance and lost both games in its group.

From 1925 to 1962, Jamaica had regular games with teams from Trinidad and Tobago, Haiti, and Cuba, as well as with clubs like the Haitian Racing CH and Violette AC, the British Corinthians, and the Argentinean Tigers. In 1952, the Caribbean All-Star team was formed with players from Trinidad, Cuba, Haiti, and Suriname. The team played four matches against Jamaica in Sabina Park. Jamaica won the second game 2–1 and the fourth 1–0, and the All-Stars won the first game 5–1 and the third 1–0.

Post-independence (1962–1989)
In 1962, the same year Jamaica became independent, the JFF became a member of FIFA. At the 1962 Central American and Caribbean Games played in Jamaica, the national team was led by Brazilian coach Jorge Penna. Jamaica finished in fourth place, with two wins over Puerto Rico and Cuba. A year later, Jamaica competed in the first CONCACAF Championship in El Salvador, where the team finished last in its group, which included Mexico, the Netherlands Antilles, and eventual winner Costa Rica.

In 1965, Jamaica attempted to qualify for the 1966 FIFA World Cup in England. After finishing first in its preliminary group that included Cuba and the Netherlands Antilles; Jamaica faced Costa Rica and Mexico in the final round, where the winner would qualify for the World Cup. Opening the final round campaign with a 3–2 loss at home against Mexico, Jamaica lost the return match 8–0, with Isidoro Díaz getting a hat-trick for Mexico. Jamaica then lost 7–0 to Costa Rica and ended with a draw at home in the return match, ultimately finishing with a single point. In January 1967, Jamaica attempted to qualify for the CONCACAF Championship but was eliminated after finishing third in the group of five.

In 1968, George Hamilton became the new coach as Jamaica attempted to qualify for the 1970 FIFA World Cup in Mexico. Most of the squad for the campaign was young with only a few remaining players from its previous attempt at qualifying being in the team. This was due to most of its players being either retired or migrated abroad. Jamaica finished last with zero points from four games. After finishing last in the 1969 CONCACAF Championship and not qualifying for the following championship, Jamaica had to withdraw from qualifying for the 1973 CONCACAF Championship after 17 players were suspended for poor behavior during a tour to Bermuda. In 1977, Jamaica competed in qualifying for the 1977 CONCACAF Championship, which was also the qualifier for the 1978 FIFA World Cup. Taking on Cuba in the first round, Jamaica lost both of its games 5–1 on aggregate.

Jamaica did not attempt to qualify for the 1982 and 1986 due to insufficient funds and a poorly prepared team. The team returned to international competition after qualifying for the 1989 CONCACAF Championship, which was part of the qualifiers for the 1990 FIFA World Cup in Italy. After defeating Puerto Rico 3–1 on aggregate in the preliminary round, Jamaica played the United States for a spot in the finals. After a 0–0 draw at home, Jamaica lost 5–1 in the US and was eliminated.

Caribbean triumph and World Cup appearance (1990–2000)
In 1990, Carl Brown was signed as head coach and led Jamaica into qualifying for the 1990 Caribbean Cup, finishing tied for third place after the final round was abandoned due to Tropical Storm Arthur. In 1991, Jamaica defeated Trinidad and Tobago 2–0 to win the Caribbean Cup and qualify for the CONCACAF Gold Cup. In the Gold Cup, Jamaica finished last with zero points in a group consisting of Honduras, Mexico, and Canada.

After the Jamaicans lost to Trinidad and Tobago in the final of the 1992 Caribbean Cup, they started their campaign in preliminary rounds of qualifying for the 1994 World Cup. After defeating Puerto Rico 3–1 on aggregate in the second preliminary round, Jamaica eliminated Trinidad and Tobago and was grouped with Bermuda, Canada, and El Salvador, two of which would advance to the final round. Jamaica opened the second round with two 1–1 draws against Canada and Bermuda, but the team lost its return match in Canada after a single goal from Dale Mitchell. After a 3–2 home win over Bermuda and two losses to El Salvador, Jamaica finished in third place and was eliminated.

In 1993, Jamaica finished in second place after losing on penalties to Martinique in the final of the Caribbean Cup, which was a qualifier for the CONCACAF Gold Cup which was held later that year. During this tournament, the team opened with a 1–0 loss to the US before recording their first Gold Cup win against Honduras. After qualifying in second place with a 1–1 draw against Honduras, Jamaica lost 6–1 to Mexico in the semi-final in Mexico City. After not qualifying for the final round of the 1994 Caribbean Cup despite recording its largest-ever win margin in a 12–0 win against the British Virgin Islands, the team decided to hire Brazilian René Simões to assist Brown with the goal of qualifying for the 1998 World Cup. After being eliminated in the group stage of both the 1995 Caribbean Cup by virtue of head-to-head and the 1996 Caribbean Cup, Jamaica opened its 1998 World Cup qualifiers with an 2–0 aggregate win over Suriname and defeated Barbados 3–0 in the following round. In 1997, Simões, by then promoted to head coach, scouted for players in England that had Jamaican heritage to join the national team. Paul Hall, Fitzroy Simpson, Deon Burton and Robbie Earle were all named in the squad due their heritage. The term 'UB40' became used in Jamaica and more widely to describe their British-born players such as Hall and Gayle, the term is a nod to the English band UB40, who perform reggae, a genre of music that originated in Jamaica. After finishing winless in the first four games of the final qualifying round, Jamaica recorded three 1–0 wins over El Salvador, Canada, and Costa Rica, with Burton scoring the winning goal in each of the latter two matches. After a 0–0 draw against Mexico, Jamaica secured its qualification and made its first-ever World Cup appearance, and the following day was declared a national holiday.

In 1998, Jamaica competed at the 1998 CONCACAF Gold Cup, finishing first in a group comprising World Cup champion Brazil, Guatemala, and El Salvador. With the help of goalkeeper Warren Barrett, Jamaica opened with a 0–0 tie against Brazil. After wins over Guatemala and El Salvador, Jamaica advanced to the semi-final against Mexico. The match went into overtime before Mexican player Luis Hernandez scored the winning goal. In the third-place playoff, Jamaica lost 1–0 to Brazil, ending in fourth place. At the 1998 FIFA World Cup, Jamaica finished third in Group H with three points from a 2–1 win against Japan in Lyon. Theodore Whitmore scored both goals in the victory.

The following month, Jamaica competed in the finals of the 1998 Caribbean Cup, which was a qualifier for the 2000 CONCACAF Gold Cup. After finishing first in its group, Jamaica won the final 2–1 against Trinidad and Tobago, with goals from Oneil McDonald and Dean Sewell. In 1999, Jamaica experienced its biggest defeat in a 9–0 loss against Costa Rica. After finishing second in its group, Jamaica was eliminated by Cuba in the semi finals of the 1999 Caribbean Cup. At the Gold Cup, Jamaica finished last in its group, losing against Colombia and Honduras 2–0 and 1–0, respectively.

Struggles at continental level (2001–2009)
In the 2002 FIFA World Cup qualification semi-finals, Jamaica faced Honduras, El Salvador, and Saint Vincent and the Grenadines in the second group. Jamaica finished second, securing a spot in the final round despite losing two games to Honduras and El Salvador. In the final round of qualifying, Jamaica finished in fifth place after being eliminating by Honduras. Between the two rounds of World Cup qualifying, Jamaica was eliminated in the group stage of the 2001 Caribbean Cup by goal-difference and missed out on qualifying for the Gold Cup the following year. Jamaica qualified for the 2003 Gold Cup, reaching the quarter-finals before being eliminated by Mexico 5–0 at the Estadio Azteca.

Jamaica started its 2006 FIFA World Cup qualifying campaign in the second round with a 4–1 aggregate win over Haiti to reach the third round. Jamaica finished third in group play, with a 1–1 draw against the US and one point away from reaching the next round. Coach Sebastião Lazaroni was sacked due to the team's performance. In the 2005 Caribbean Cup, Jamaica tied its largest-ever win margin record with a 12–0 win over Saint Martin, with Luton Shelton and Roland Dean both getting hat-tricks. After reaching the final with wins against Saint Lucia and French Guiana, Jamaica claimed its third title and a spot at the Gold Cup. At the Gold Cup, Jamaica reached the quarter finals before losing to the US 3–1 in Foxborough, with American player DaMarcus Beasley scoring two goals.

In 2006 and 2007, Jamaica continued to struggle, with one Jamaican journalist dubbing the team "The Reggae Toyz". The team failed to qualify for the 2007 Caribbean Cup after being eliminated due to goals scored, with St. Vincent and the Grenadines scoring three more goals than Jamaica. Two managers later, the team only earned a single point from three matches in the third round of qualification for the 2010 FIFA World Cup. With coach Theodore Whitmore, Jamaica secured three wins from its remaining matches, jumping from 116th to 83rd place in the world rankings. Despite the team's final win over Canada, Jamaica was eliminated by goal difference after Mexico finished three goals ahead. Jamaica won the 2008 Caribbean Cup, with Luton Shelton scoring both goals in the victory against Grenada to qualify for the Gold Cup. At the Gold Cup, Jamaica finished third in its group; with a single win over El Salvador, the side finished last among the third-place teams and was eliminated.

Continental finals appearances (2010–2019)

Jamaica entered the final round of the 2010 Caribbean Cup after a 0–0 draw with Costa Rica. After finishing first in its group, Jamaica won against Grenada in the semi-finals, then defeating first-time finalists Guadeloupe in a penalty shoot-out. Jamaica earned its fifth title, and coach Theodore Whitmore became the first to win the Caribbean Cup as both player and coach. In the 2011 CONCACAF Gold Cup, Jamaica finished first in its group, beating Grenada 4–0, Guatemala 2–0, and Honduras 1–0 before being eliminated by the US, with goals from American players Jermaine Jones and Clint Dempsey.

In qualifying for the 2014 FIFA World Cup, Jamaica started in the third round and earned seven points in the first three games, which included a historic 2–1 win over the United States at home which was their first win over the Americans. Jamaica later qualified with a 4–1 win over Antigua and Barbuda, finishing two goals ahead of Guatemala in its group. After the team finished last in its group for the 2012 Caribbean Cup and failed to record a win in six matches in the fourth round of qualifying, team manager Theodore Whitmore resigned and was replaced by German coach Winfried Schäfer. After a 2–0 loss to the US, Jamaica finished in last place and was eliminated.

After qualifying for the 2015 Gold Cup due to winning the 2014 Caribbean Cup, Jamaica was invited to compete in the 2015 edition of the Copa América in Chile. At the Copa America, Jamaica was drawn in Group B with Uruguay, Paraguay, and Argentina. Jamaica finished last after losing all three of its matches 1–0, with Jobi McAnuff saying, "I don't think many people would have given us that chance." A few weeks later in the 2015 Gold Cup, Jamaica finished first in its group and defeated Haiti in the quarter-finals with a goal from Giles Barnes to qualify for the semi-finals for the first time since 1998. In the semi-final, Jamaica defeated the US 2–1 with goals from Darren Mattocks and Giles Barnes, reaching its first-ever Gold Cup final. In the final, Jamaica lost to Mexico 3–1.

In qualifying for the 2018 FIFA World Cup, Jamaica started in the third round and defeated Nicaragua 4–3 on aggregate to reach the fourth round. In the fourth round, Jamaica started off strong with a 1–0 win over Haiti and a 1–1 draw with Costa Rica, earning four points after three games. However, three straight losses, including a 2–0 loss against Panama, eliminated Jamaica from World Cup qualifying. Between the fourth-round matches, Jamaica competed in the Copa América Centenario after qualifying through the 2014 Caribbean Cup. Jamaica finished with no points from their three games, scoring no goals and conceding six.

After Whitmore returned to the team, Jamaica qualified for the 2017 Caribbean Cup, reaching the final before losing to first-time finalists Curaçao 2–1, with Elson Hooi scoring both of Curaçao's goals. In the 2017 Gold Cup, Jamaica upset Mexico 1–0 in the semi-finals, with Kemar Lawrence scoring the goal. In the final against the US, Jamaica conceded the opening goal at the end of the first half before Je-Vaughn Watson tied the score in the 50th minute. However, after a goal in the 88th minute from Jordan Morris, the US won the title, and Jamaica finished as runner-up.

Post-pandemic (2020–present)
In 2020, Jamaica played a single international friendly versus Bermuda before all international football was placed on hold by FIFA due to the COVID-19 pandemic.

In 2021, Jamaica reached the 2021 Gold Cup quarterfinals, where they lost 0–1 to the USA.

On 9 December 2021, Theodore Whitmore was dismissed as senior national team head coach.

Jamaica has not made another world cup appearance since 1998. Since then the main goal of the Jamaican Reggae-Boyz is to make another world cup.

Stadium

Between 1926 and 1962. Jamaica played its matches at Sabina Park, which is also home to the West Indies cricket team. In 1962, the football team moved to Independence Park, which was built for the 1962 Central American and Caribbean Games held after the country gained independence; the first home match was a 6–1 victory over Puerto Rico. The stadium is nicknamed The Office while the team plays.

The team has also played at Jarrett Park and Trelawny Stadium at the 2008 Caribbean Cup. They have also played at the Montego Bay Sports Complex in the 2014 Caribbean Cup.

Kits
The national team have used four clothing manufacturers to supply the official kit for Jamaica. The team's first supplier was Italian manufacturer Lanzera in 1995 before it merged with Kappa a year later. This deal was terminated after the 1998 World Cup. In 2000, the JFF signed a deal with German sporting brand Uhlsport, which lasted until 2006.

In 2021, Umbro was the kit provider for Jamaica. In 2022, Adidas signed a deal to become the new kit provider for Jamaica starting in 2023.

Results and fixtures

2022

2023

Coaching staff

Coaching staff

Technical staff

Coaching history
Caretaker managers are listed in italics.

 Jorge Penna (1962)
 Antoine Tassy (1962–1964)
 Jorge Penna (1965–1967)
 George Hamilton (1967)
 George Thomson (1967–1974)
 George Prescod (1974–1975)
 Otmar Calder (1975)
 George Prescod (1975–1978)
 Jackie Bell (1978–1982)
 Carl Brown (1983–1986)
 Aldrick McNab (1987)
 Delroy Scott (1987–1988)
 Geoffrey Maxwell (1988–1990)
 Carl Brown (1990–1994)
 René Simões (1994–2000)
 Sebastião Lazaroni (2000)
 Clovis de Oliveira (2000–2001)
 Carl Brown (2001–2004)
 Sebastião Lazaroni (2004–2005)
 Wendell Downswell (2005–2006)
 Carl Brown (2006)
 Bora Milutinović (2006–2007)
 René Simões (2008)
 John Barnes (2008–2009)
 Theodore Whitmore (2009–2013)
 Winfried Schäfer (2013–2016)
 Theodore Whitmore (2016–2021)
 Paul Hall (2021–2022)
 Merron Gordon (2022)
 Heimir Hallgrímsson (2022–present)

Players

Current squad
 The following players were called up for the Friendly match.
 Match dates: 11 March 2023 and 14 March 2023
 Opposition: Caps and goals correct as of: 9 November 2022, after the match against 

Recent call-ups
The following players have also been called up to the team in the past 12 months.

COV Withdrew from the squad due to COVID-19.
INJ Withdrew from the squad due to injury.
WD Withdrew from the squad for personal reasons.
PRE Preliminary squad / standby.
RET Retired from the national team.

Player records

Players in bold are still active with Jamaica.

Most appearances

Top goalscorers

Competitive record

FIFA World Cup

Jamaica's only appearance at the FIFA World Cup was in 1998. The team opened with a 3–1 loss against Croatia in Lens. After falling behind in the 27th minute, Robbie Earle scored the equalizer to close the first half. In the second half, Croatia scored two goals, causing Jamaica to lose the match. The second match against Argentina saw Gabriel Batistuta getting a second half hat-trick, aiding in Jamaica's second defeat and elimination from the World Cup. In the final match of the tournament, Theodore Whitmore scored a double, securing Jamaica's first World Cup win with a 2–1 win over Japan, whilst also allows Jamaica to become the second team from the Caribbean after Cuba to have won a World Cup game.

CONCACAF Gold Cup

CONCACAF Championship 1963–1989, CONCACAF Gold Cup 1991–present

CONCACAF Nations League

Copa América

Jamaica was invited to the Copa América for the first time in 2015, finishing last among Argentina, Uruguay, and Paraguay. The following year, the team competed in the Copa América Centenario as winners of the 2014 Caribbean Cup, again finishing last in the group stage with a 3–0 loss to Uruguay.

CFU Caribbean Cup

Head-to-head record
As of 17 November 2021, the national team has played in 569 matches, with 227 wins, 124 draws, and 218 losses since their first international match in 1925. In total, the team has scored 752 goals and conceded 744 goals. Jamaica's highest winning margin is twelve goals, which has been achieved on two occasions: against the British Virgin Islands in 1994 (12–0) and against Saint Martin in 2004 (12–0). Their longest winning streak is seven wins and their unbeaten record is 22 consecutive official matches.

The following table shows Jamaica's all-time international record, correct as of 2 February 2022. Teams in italics aren't member of FIFA.

FIFA World Ranking

Last update was on 27 May 2021
Source:

 Best Ranking   Worst Ranking   Best Mover   Worst Mover  

HonoursMajor competitionsCONCACAF Championship / Gold Cup Runners-up (2): 2015, 2017
 Third place: 1993
 Fair Play Award: 2015Other competitionsCaribbean Cup Champions (6):''' 1991, 1998, 2005, 2008, 2010, 2014
 Runners-up (3): 1992, 1993, 2017
 Third place (2): 1997, 1999

See also

 National Premier League (top league in Jamaica)
 Jamaica national under-20 football team
 Jamaica national under-17 football team
 Football in Jamaica

Notes

References

External links

 Jamaican Football Federation 
 Jamaica FIFA profile

 
Caribbean national association football teams
Football in Jamaica